Edward Pitt (died 1643) was an English landowner and politician who sat in the House of Commons in 1624. 

Pitt was the son of Sir William Pitt and his wife  Edith Cadbury, daughter of Nicholas Cadbury of Arne, Dorset. He was a teller in the Exchequer. In 1624, he was elected Member of Parliament for Poole in the Happy Parliament. In the Civil War he was seized by parliamentary forces at his home Stratfield Saye House in 1643 and imprisoned in Windsor Castle. He died a week after his release.

Pitt married  Rachel Morton, daughter of Sir George Morton, 1st Baronet of Milborne St. Andrew, Dorset. Their son George was also an MP.

References

Year of birth missing
1643 deaths
English MPs 1624–1625
English landowners
Pitt family